Direct quantum chemistry covers a set of quantum chemical methods not using the Born–Oppenheimer representation.  Direct quantum chemistry considers the motion of the nuclei and the electrons on the same time scales. The method therefore considers the molecular Hamiltonian as a whole without trying to solve separately the Schrödinger equation associated to the electronic molecular Hamiltonian.  Though the method is non-adiabatic it is distinguishable from most non adiabatic methods for treating the molecular dynamics, which typically use the Born-Oppenheimer representation, but become non-adiabatic by considering vibronic coupling explicitly.  
Direct quantum chemistry is applied in the modelling of high-speed atomic collisions, where the nuclear motion may be comparable or faster than the electronic motion.

The group of Yngve Öhrn in Gainesville, Florida has been a pioneer in this field.  He applied the method to the collision between two hydrogen atoms.

Quantum chemistry